Justice Nagendra Kumar Jain is an Indian judge, and the current chairman of Bar Council of Rajasthan. He was also invited to discuss the reforms in the judiciary by Parliamentary Estimate committee in 1985. He became a member of the Bar council of India and Member of  Executive and governing council of National Law School of India University in 1986.

Early life 
He was born on 20 October 1942 in Alwar Rajasthan and completed his primary education from Happy School. Later he shifted to Jaipur for his higher education and completed his secondary education from Mahaveer School. He further continued his education from Maharaja College, Jaipur and graduated from Rajasthan College of Rajasthan University. He also represented state in several National and interstate Badminton tournaments from 1955 to 1968 and in 1977 he also played Nationals in veterans.

Career 
After receiving his degree of The Bachelor of Laws (LLB) from Jodhpur University in 1967 he was enrolled as an advocate on 26 January 1968 in Rajasthan High Court and started his practice with emphasis on Civil, Criminal, Constitutional, Writ, Company and Taxation Matters. He also worked as a part-time Lecturer in Jodhpur University and served on the following positions before being appointed Judge of Rajasthan High court.
 Secretary of the Rajasthan High Court Bar Association, Jaipur
 Member of Rajasthan Bar Federation
 Lifetime Member of Bar Association of India and Executive Member 1984~86.
 Member Executive and Governing Council National Law School of India University
 Member Bar Council of Rajasthan since 1971 till elevation
 Chairman Bar Council of Rajasthan 1985-86
 Member, Bar Council of India and India 1987 till elevation (trust)

He became a Judge of Rajasthan High Court on 20 July 1990. He spent around six years at Jodhpur and about 16 months at Jaipur bench as a Judge. He was transferred to Madras High Court on 18 November 1997. He officiated as Chief Justice on 22 January 1999 till May 1999, 28 September to 9 October 1999 then 6 June till becoming permanent Chief Justice in Madras High Court on 13 September 2000. Thereafter he was transferred as Chief Justice of Karnataka High Court on 31 August 2001 and superannuated on 19 October 2004.  Some of the important milestones of his Judicial career are as follows:

 Judge in the Rajasthan High Court from 20 July 1990 till 18 December 1997
 Nominated by Chief Justice of India as Member of Academic Council of National Law School of India, Bangalore from 1993 to 1996
 Judge in the Madras High Court from 18 November 1997 till 21 January 1999.
 Chief Justice of Madras High Court from 13 September 2000 till 30 August 2001
 Chief Justice of Karnataka High Court from 31 August 2001 till 19 October 2004
 Chairperson, Himachal Pradesh Human Rights Commission from 24 November 2004 till 15 July 2005
 Lokayukta, Himachal Pradesh till 15 July 2005
 Chairperson of the Rajasthan State Human rights Commission from 16 July 2005 till 15 July 2010

Rajasthan State Human rights Commission 
List of incidents reported and addressed along with documentation of the cases reported in the previous year before his tenure began.

President of the Management Committee Shri Mahavirji 
He is a lifetime member of this working committee since January 1997 and contributes his efforts on regular basis. Under his presidency February 2011~14, he took the effort to publish an Introduction of the members of this committee since its inception in the year 1930, to highlight their contributions and motivate fellow members. He has broadly categorized his scope of work beyond the routine set of functions and activities which are regularly organised by the committee under the following heading.

A stamp was released with pictorial view of the temple along with the seal on postcard on 13th Rajpex 2012.

Recent activities 
Following his retirement from the bench, Jain has campaigned against child marriage, organised by Help Educate Children (HEC) and Awareness for Training, Motivation and Action (ATMA) supported by UNICEF India.

Publications
List of his publications during his tenure as Chairperson of Rajasthan Human Rights Commission:
 Human Rights according to Article-21 of the Constitution of India.
 Human Rights & Duties according to Article-51(A).
 Points to remember on Human Rights Day.
 Human Rights and HIV/AIDS.
 Policies & Procedures of working of Human Rights Commission.
 Rules & Regulations of Human Rights Commission 
 Human Rights for Children.
 Human Rights for Women.
 Human Rights for schedule caste & tribes with special privileges.
 Human Rights in reference to arrest.
 Human Rights in reference to imprisonment or jail.
 Human Rights in reference to MLA Scheme.
 Human Rights in reference to Government Development schemes.

References

External links
 

1942 births
Living people
Judges of the Rajasthan High Court
Chief Justices of the Madras High Court
Chief Justices of the Karnataka High Court
20th-century Indian judges
People from Alwar
21st-century Jains